The Yamaha CS2x is a sample-based synthesizer released by the Yamaha Corporation in 1999. The CS2x is designed for maximum real-time control, according to Yamaha. It is the successor of the very successful Yamaha CS1x. Enhancements include 64-note polyphony, a bigger sample ROM and a 24 dB/oct LPF/HPF filter. The CS acronym stands for Control Synthesizer.

Features
 61 full-size non-weighted keys
 16 MB of Wave ROM with AWM2 voices
 Multi Mode: 779 voices in XG mode
 Performance Mode: 256 preset and 256 user performances
 30 drum kits
 Arpeggiator with 40 patterns
 8 real-time sound control knobs
 2 Scene memories, for morphing between sound control knob positions
 Three 24-bit effect processors (12 reverb, 14 chorus and 62 variations)
 Stereo audio input, only for mixing another sound source into the CS2x, no effects applied
 To Host serial computer interface, connecting the CS2x to a computer for sequencing purposes
 Small backlit LCD display with 2 lines

The Yamaha CS2x has a silver body color, in contrast to the CS1x blue body.
It is immediately recognized by its remarkable left chamfered edge.

The CS2x also offers a TG300B mode, for playing music created for Yamaha TG300B-compatible tone generators.
Some of the sounds are derived from Yamaha's flagship EX5 series.

Panel
The left side of the front panel has a volume knob and next to that are 8 knobs for controlling the sound parameters. There are 3 knobs for controlling the envelope settings and 3 for high and low cutoff and resonance filter settings. Also there are 2 assignable knobs.
In the middle there is a numeric keypad to select a specific voice program number.
On the right side there is a comprehensive edit matrix visible to control more synthesizer parameters. Turn the selector knob to select the row and adjust the corresponding parameter with the up/down buttons.

Connections
The interface is handled by MIDI In, Out and Thru connections on the back of the synth. There are 3 foot control switches of which 2 are assignable. There's also a serial To Host port for direct connection to a Mac or PC. Drivers can be downloaded from the XG software page on the Yamaha website.

Display
The display of the CS2x consists of 2 lines. The top line shows the sound category, e.g. Or for Organs, Pd for Pads, and Ld for Lead sounds. After that is the name of the sound, which can be changed by the user. The second line shows P or P for the preset banks, U or U for the user banks. If there is an E symbol visible, this means that the current sound has been edited and needs to be stored in the memory to keep the changes that have been made. Next to that the selected sound number, and below on the right a small indication of what layer and octave is selected.
Small arrows on the top and bottom of the display show what state the CS2x is in, e.g. Performance, Multi, or Utility mode.

Sequencer
The Yamaha CS2x can be expanded with a small sequencer workstation module. The CS1x, CS2x and AN1x synthesizers all have a small lip on the right hand end of the front panel to accommodate a QY or SU sized module. The QY70 or QY100 module in particular were most suited in both appearance and support.

External links
Yamaha CS2x product page
Yamaha CS2x review (Sound on Sound Magazine)
Yamaha CS2x on VintageSynth
Yamaha QY70 review (Sound on Sound Magazine)

CS2x
Polyphonic synthesizers
Digital synthesizers
Virtual analog synthesizers